Charlotte and Laura Tremble (born 4 June 1999 in Compiègne), are French synchronized swimmers.

Career 
The twins discovered synchronized swimming at a gala and started this sport at the age of six in the Senlis club. The following year, they took part in an internship with Virginie Dedieu, three-time world champion in the discipline. At first, they refused to join the Pôle Espoirs of the Federation, which did not prevent them from winning the French Championships at the age of 14 in 2013. At the age of 15, they finally integrated INSEP in order to combine their education and intensive training. In 2016, they obtained a scientific baccalaureate with honors and pursued a Bachelor's degree in physics and chemistry at Sorbonne University. They then join the aerospace College Institut polytechnique des sciences avancées (IPSA class of 2025). They were selected for the French team in 2015 and took part in the European Games for their first senior competition.

At the 2018 European Championships, the twins finished 7th in the standings, just five points from the podium. In July 2019, during the World Championships in Gwangju in South Korea, the duo ranked 8th and obtained their ticket for the 2020 Summer Olympics postponed to 2021 due to the Covid crisis.

In 2020, they finished second in the technical duo of the Open de France.

References

1999 births
Living people
French synchronized swimmers
Twin sportspeople
Institut Polytechnique des Sciences Avancées alumni
Sorbonne University
Olympic synchronized swimmers of France
Synchronized swimmers at the 2020 Summer Olympics
European Aquatics Championships medalists in synchronised swimming
French twins
People from Compiègne
Sportspeople from Oise